Þorsteinn Bachmann (born 25 October 1965) is an Icelandic actor. He is known for his role as Móri in Life in a Fishbowl. In 2015 he won an Edda Award for that same role.

Early life 
Þorsteinn grew up in the Fossvogur area of Reykjavík, Iceland before moving to Breiðholt when he was 10 years old. He did not do well in school in the early years. Looking back, he remembers that he was barely able to read or write before changing schools from Fossvogur to the one in Breiðholt.

Career
Þorsteinn graduated from the Icelandic Drama School in 1991. Since graduation, he has worked with theatre groups in Reykjavík and Akureyri and was president of the latter for a few years. He has held many acting courses, and has served as a teacher at both the Icelandic Drama School and the Icelandic Film School. In 2013, he worked with the National Theatre of Iceland.

Personal life 
Before every premiere, Þorsteinn goes to the gym, goes swimming and finishes off with a sauna. "This is something I've always done and goes with every film or stage premiere".

Selected filmography
Íslenski draumurinn (English title The Icelandic Dream) (2000)
A Man Like Me (English title A Man Like Me) (2002)
Strákarnir okkar (English title Eleven Men Out) (2005)
Blóðbönd (English title Thicker Than Water) (2006)
The Quiet Storm (2007)
Volcano (2011)
Stormland (2011)
Either Way (2011)
Life in a Fishbowl (2014)
Trapped (2015-2016)
The Oath (2016)
Under the Tree (2017)
Tom of Finland (2017)
And Breathe Normally (2018)
Let Me Fall (2018)
The County (2019)
Agnes Joy (2019)
Katla (2021)

Awards

References

External links

Living people
1965 births
Thorsteinn Bachmann
20th-century Icelandic male actors
Thorsteinn Bachmann
21st-century Icelandic male actors
Male actors from Reykjavík